A compendium (plural: compendia or compendiums) is a comprehensive collection of information and analysis pertaining to a body of knowledge. A compendium may concisely summarize a larger work. In most cases, the body of knowledge will concern a specific field of human interest or endeavour (for example: hydrogeology, logology, ichthyology, phytosociology or myrmecology), while a general encyclopedia can be referred to as a compendium of all human knowledge.

The word compendium arrives from the Latin word compeneri, meaning "to weigh together or balance". The 21st century has seen the rise of democratized, online compendia in various fields.

Meaning, etymology and definitions
The Latin prefix 'con-'  is used in compound words to suggest, 'a being or bringing together of many objects' and also suggests striving for completeness with perfection. And compenso means balance, poise, weigh, offset.

The entry on the word 'compendious' in the Online Etymology Dictionary says "concise, abridged but comprehensive," "concise compilation comprising the general principles or leading points of a longer 'system or work',". Its etymology comes from a Medieval Latin use (com+pendere), literally meaning to weigh together.

Examples

A field guide is a compendium of species found within a geographic area, or within a taxon of natural occurrence such as animals, plants, rocks and minerals, or stars. Bestiaries were medieval compendiums that catalogued animals and facts about natural history, and were particularly popular in England and France around the 12th century.

A cookbook is a compendium of recipes within a given food culture.

An example would be the Catechism of the Catholic Church, a concise 598-question-and-answer book which summarises the teachings of the Catholic Church.

Most nations have compendiums or compilations of law meant to be comprehensive for use by their judiciary; for example, the 613 commandments, or the United States Code.  

The collected works of Aristotle is a compendium of natural philosophy, metaphysics, language arts, and social science.  

The single volume Propædia is Encyclopædia Britannica'''s compendium of the many volumes of its Macropaedia.  

The Bible is a group of many writings of the law, prophets, and writings of the Hebrew Bible held to be comprehensive and complete within Judaism and called the Old Testament by Christianity.  

Some well known literary figures have written their own compendium. An example would be Alexandre Dumas, author of The Three Musketeers, and a gourmand. His compendium on food titled From Absinthe to Zest serves as an alphabet for food lovers.

In popular culture
"Compendium" appears as a Latin pun in the English translation of the Franco-Belgian comics The Adventures of Asterix'', where it is the name of one of the four Roman military camps surrounding the Gaulish village where the protagonists reside.

Compendium Records is the name of Norway's first progressive record store and label, which was located on Bernt Ankers Gate, in Oslo, Norway, between the years 1974 and 1977. The label specialised in quality experimental and progressive music and books; they also released 10 albums on their in-house record label.

See also
Edited volume
Manual
Monograph
Treatise
Anthology

References

External links

 The Oxford English Dictionary site
 Medicines Compendium

Reference works